The Masovian dialect, also written Mazovian, is the dialect of Polish spoken in Mazovia and historically related regions, in northeastern Poland. It is the most distinct of the Polish dialects and the most expansive.

Mazovian dialects may exhibit such features as mazurzenie, sandhi (intervocalic voicing of obstruents on word boundaries), and asynchronous palatal pronunciation of labial consonants (so-called softening). The Kurpie region has some of the most distinctive phonetic features due to isolation. Characteristics include:
 merger of the retroflex series sz, ż, cz, dż into the alveolar s, z, c, dz;
  >  before certain consonants;
 the Old Polish dual number marker -wa continues to be attached to verbs;
 certain instances of a > e;
  > 

Masovian dialects also contain certain vocabulary that is distinct from the standard Polish language and shares common characteristics with the Kashubian language.

Subdialects
Mazovian dialects include but are not limited to subdialects of:
 Białystok dialect
 Suwałki dialect
 Warmia dialect
 Kurpie dialect
 Masurian dialect
 Malbork-Lubawa dialect
 Ostróda dialect
 Near Mazovian dialect
 Far Mazovian dialect
 Warsaw dialect

References

Bibliography
 Barbara Bartnicka (red.): Polszczyzna Mazowsza i Podlasia. Łomża-Warszawa 1993.
 Anna Basara: Studia nad wokalizmem w gwarach Mazowsza. Wrocław-Warszawa-Kraków 1965.
 Anna Cegieła: Polski Słownik terminologii i gwary teatralnej. Wrocław 1992.
 Jadwiga Chludzińska-Świątecka: Ze studiów nad słowotwórstwem gwar mazowieckich. Poradnik Językowy, z. 6, 1961, s. 253–258.
 Karol Dejna: Dialekty polskie. Ossolineum 1993.
 Barbara Falińska (red.): Gwary Mazowsza, Podlasia i Suwalszczyzny.ɴ I. Filipów, pow. Suwałki, Białystok, 2004.
 Województwo płockie. Uniwersytet Łódzki, Łódź-Płock 1984.

Polish dialects